Shannon Kathleen Bird (born April 23, 1969) is an American politician who is a member of the Colorado House of Representatives from the 29th district in Adams County.

Biography 
Bird was born in Reno, Nevada and was raised by her mother and grandmother. Her family later moved to Colorado. She attended the University of Colorado Boulder and graduated with a B.A. in economics and earned a M.S. in finance and a M.B.A.  from the University of Colorado Denver. She graduated with a J.D. from the University of Denver.

From 2015 to 2019, Bird served as a member in the Westminster City Council.

Political career
Since 2021, Bird has served in the House Finance Committee. In 2022, Bird was selected to fill one of the vacant seats on the influential Joint Budget Committee for her next term starting in January 2023. Her legislative focus includes afforable housing, healthcare, education, transportation and public safety.

Election
Bird was elected in the general election on November 6, 2018, winning 59 percent of the vote over 37 percent of Republican candidate Bruce Baker. She won re-election in 2020 with 62% of the vote and was re-elected again in 2022 with over 61% of the vote.

Personal life 
Bird is an attorney. She is married and has two children.

References

Bird, Shannon
Living people
21st-century American politicians
21st-century American women politicians
Women state legislators in Colorado
1969 births